Diary of a G is the eleventh studio album from rapper Mr. Capone-E released on August 25, 2009 through his own record label Hi-Power Entertainment. Mr. Capone-E produced Diary of a G with co-producer Fingazz. Diary of a G is a two-disc set with the album plus the DVD; the DVD shows all the steps Mr. Capone-E takes to make the album. The DVD features artists such as Lil Eazy-E, Lil Rob, Snoop Dogg, The Game, Mr. Criminal, Prima J, (Boxer) Amrkhan, and more. The album features artist's such as Snoop Dogg, Mr. Criminal, Fingazz, The Game, Glasses Malone, Birdman, and more. Including the single "Light My Fire" featuring Snoop Dogg & Fingazz.

Track listing
 Gangster Prayer
 It Ain't About Me
 Gang Bangin' Shit
 Three Of The Best From The West (featuring The Game & Snoop Dogg)
 Real Riders (featuring Glasses Malone)
 South Sider's Most Wanted (featuring Mr. Criminal)
 Lupillo Rivera (Shout Out) [Corrido Skit]
 Light My Fire (featuring Fingazz, Mr. Criminal, Miss Lady Pinks & Snoop Dogg)
 Getting It (Remix) (featuring Bigg Steele, Fingazz & Birdman)
 No Problem (featuring Elite 1 & Lucky Luciano)
 They Wanna Murder Me
 Against All Odds
 Drinkin' Out Da-40 Bottle (Rain Drops)
 Outlaws Part Two
 I Wanna Fuck (featuring Carolyn Rodriguez & Miss Lady Pinks)
 Like This And Like That
 Stiletos (featuring Fingazz)
 Ooops Upside Your Head
 Ain't Lookin Back No More
 This is My Diary
 Outro

Charts

2009 albums
Mr. Capone-E albums